John Charles Compton Cavendish, 5th Baron Chesham, PC (18 June 1916 – 23 December 1989), was a British Conservative politician.

A member of the Cavendish family headed by the Duke of Devonshire he was the son of John Compton Cavendish, 4th Baron Chesham and his first wife, Margot Mills.

Cavendish was educated at Eton College, Lyceum Alpinum Zuoz in Switzerland, and Trinity College, Cambridge. He fought in the Second World War as a captain in the Army, also briefly serving as an Air Observation Post pilot with No. 664 Squadron RCAF. Chesham took his seat in the House of Lords on his father's death in 1952, and later served in the Conservative administrations of Harold Macmillan and Sir Alec Douglas-Home. He was Joint Parliamentary Secretary to the Ministry of Transport from 1959 to 1964. The latter year he was also admitted to the Privy Council. Chesham was later Chairman of the International Road Federation, and President of the British Road Federation from 1966 to 1972.

A motoring enthusiast, Chesham first started motorcycling when he attended Cambridge University, riding Rex-Acme, AJS, Rudge and competing on an Excelsior at Brooklands. He joined the Royal Automobile Club as Executive Vice-Chairman from April, 1966, then a newly created salaried position, until 1970.

Lord Chesham married Mary Edmunds Marshall, daughter of David Gregory Marshall, in 1937. He died in December 1989, aged 73, and was succeeded in the barony by his son Nicholas Charles Cavendish.

Notes

References 
 Kidd, Charles, Williamson, David (editors). Debrett's Peerage and Baronetage (1990 edition). New York: St Martin's Press, 1990, 
 
 
 British Army Officers 1939-1945

1916 births
1989 deaths
John Cavendish, 5th Baron Chesham
5
Members of the Privy Council of the United Kingdom
Conservative Party (UK) Baronesses- and Lords-in-Waiting
British Army personnel of World War II
Royal Artillery officers
People educated at Eton College
Royal Buckinghamshire Yeomanry officers
Eldest sons of British hereditary barons
Place of birth missing
Place of death missing
Ministers in the third Churchill government, 1951–1955
Ministers in the Eden government, 1955–1957
Ministers in the Macmillan and Douglas-Home governments, 1957–1964
British World War II pilots
Alumni of Lyceum Alpinum Zuoz
Alumni of Trinity College, Cambridge